Sycacantha orphnogenes is a species of moth of the family Tortricidae. It is found in the Democratic Republic of the Congo.

The larvae feed on Acanthus arboreus.

References

Moths described in 1939
Olethreutini
Sycacantha
Endemic fauna of the Democratic Republic of the Congo